OPB may refer to:
 Obscene Publications Branch, a former unit of the Metropolitan Police in London, England
 Oregon Public Broadcasting, a radio and television network based in the U.S. state of Oregon
 Oregon Progress Board, a commission of the Oregon state government
 Xilinx On-chip Peripheral Bus, a low-speed bus for connecting peripherals within a Xilinx system on a chip
 In music, sometimes used as an abbreviation for "originally performed by" 
 Oakridge Project Bloods, a Bloods gang in Oak Ridge, Tennessee.